Courtwood GAA is a Gaelic Athletic Association gaelic football club, located in the north east corner of County Laois in Ireland. The club is located in the eastern half of Emo parish with a small catchment area south of the village of Ballybrittas and mainly covered by the local school Rath NS.

The locality is bordered on one side by County Kildare and by three neighbouring clubs in Laois: Annanough, O'Dempsey's and Emo. 

At adult level, the club is a football club only, although a period in the 2000s saw Courtwood dabble in the small ball game. Courtwood currently field football teams at senior and junior C.
 
Juvenile football and hurling affairs are catered for by St Pauls Juvenile GAA club, an amalgamation with fellow parishioners, Emo. Courtwood also amalgamate with Emo at minor (under 17) and under 20 level.

History

Gaelic football has been played in the area since the foundation of the GAA in 1884 with evidence of the first club named Courtwood existing as early as 1888 and competing in the earliest known Laois Senior Football Championships.  The 1892 Laois Senior Football Championship final was actually played in Courtwood.

The early 1900s saw the original Courtwood club fade from existence to be replaced in the area by a club named Ballybrittas which in turn was replaced by the Jamestown club.

The current Courtwood club was reformed in 1962 and played its first game on 1 April 1962 beating Wolfhill by 3-5 to 0-1. Previous to this, players from the locality played with either the Jamestown or Annanough clubs.

Courtwood has won the Laois Junior Football Championship three times (1970, 1986 and 2014) and the Laois Intermediate Football Championship three times (1971, 1987 and 2018) and won two league titles Laois All-County Football League Division Three in 2015 and Division Two in 2018. In 2006, Courtwood's second team won the Laois Junior "C" Football Championship. 

At underage level, Courtwood have successfully combined with Emo on a number of occasions to win county titles. Emo won the Laois Minor Football Championship in 1964 and 1965 and the Laois Under 21 Football Championship in 1966 and 1967, with players from Courtwood playing on the winning teams. 

The two clubs also combined to win the Under 21 title again in 1989 and 1990 as Courtwood/Emo and returned to win the Under 21 B title again in 2012.

Courtwood as a separate entity won the 2003 Laois Minor "B" Football Championship<ref> and Emo/Courtwood returned to the county roll of honour in 2008 winning the Laois Minor "B" Football Championship, having lost out in the 2007 final of the same competition. In 2011 and 2012, an Emo, Courtwood and The Rock minor combination won two Laois Minor "B" Football Championships and two Laois Minor Football League B titles.

In 2016, Emo, Courtwood and The Rock again joined forces at minor level and won the Laois Minor Football Championship. 2019 then saw Emo/Courtwood win another minor championship with the under 20 title following later in the year under the Courtwood/Emo banner Captained by Rory Doyle and Niall Gorman.

At the younger age levels St Paul's has been quite successful in recent years. The under 14 team won the county Féile in 2013 and went on to win the county championship and retain the title in 2014. They also won the under 16 championship in 2015, 2016 and 2017.

Achievements
 Laois Intermediate Football Championship (3) 1971, 1987, 2018
 Laois Junior Football Championships (3) 1970, 1986, 2014
 Laois Junior C Football Championship (1) 2006
 Laois All-County Football League Div. 3: (1) 2015
 Laois All-County Football League Div. 2: (1) 2018
 Laois Under-21 Football Championship (2) 1989 (with Emo), 1990 (with Emo)
 Laois Under-20 Football Championship (1) 2019 (with Emo)
 Laois Under-21 B Football Championship (2) 2012 (with Emo) and 2005
 Laois Minor Football Championship (2) 2016 (with Emo and The Rock), 2019 (with Emo) 
 Laois Minor B Football Championship  (8) 1987, 1989, 1992, 2008, 2022 (all with Emo), 2011 and 2012 (with Emo and The Rock), 2003
 Laois Minor B Football League (2) 2011 and 2012 (with Emo and The Rock)

Famous players and members

Courtwood is the home club of Fergal Byron, the 2003 All-Star goalkeeper who was also instrumental in Laois's 2003 Leinster SFC triumph. He was joined in 2007 on the Laois senior panel by Niall Donoher, a minor and under 21 star with Laois.

George Doyle and John O'Connell both played senior football with Laois in the 1990s while Danny Luttrell and Tommy Dunne were on the Laois team beaten in the Leinster SFC final in 1968.

In 2014, former Courtwood player Eddie Kinsella refereed the All-Ireland Senior Football Championship final between Kerry and Donegal, with his four umpires Alan O'Halloran, Pat O'Connell, Arthur O'Connor and Niall Murphy also all club members.

In recent years, Courtwood have supplied a number of players to Laois senior, under 20/21 and minor football teams including Luke Doyle, Mark O'Halloran, Conor Hogan, Danny Luttrell, Alan Kinsella, Matthew Byron, Niall Dunne, Sean O'Flynn, Seth Burns Mooney, Paul O'Flynn, Nathan Little, Sam Krebs, Adam O'Halloran, Cian Doyle, Collins Ugochukwu and Ryan Little.

The first ever Laois team to win an All-Ireland football title was the 1973 junior team and Courtwood players Danny Luttrell, Paddy Dunne and Ned Flynn all played on that winning team.

Offaly All-Ireland Senior Football Championship winning medallist in 1971 and 1972, Larry Coughlan, played for Courtwood for a period in the mid 1970s beginning in April 1974.

Players
Fergal Byron
Larry Coughlan
Niall Donoher
George Doyle
Tommy Dunne
Danny Luttrell
John O'Connell
Sean O'Flynn

Managers

External links
 Courtwood GAA Official Website
 Laoistalk – Laois GAA News Website

References

 Minor B win of 2003
 2007 Intermediate final defeat
 2006 Junior win
 2018 Laois minor panel

Gaelic games clubs in County Laois
Gaelic football clubs in County Laois

LOYAL SUPPORTERS
Riley Reid
TYNO
Tony Keane